Badminton England is the national governing body for the sport of badminton in England.  It aims to govern, encourage and develop the sport throughout England.

Originally established in 1893 as the Badminton Association of England in Portsmouth,  the association is now based in Milton Keynes and has departments for Elite Play, Events, Membership, Development and Coaching.  It closely liaises with the 41 Counties of England to provide support to the club and league structures.

The body was a founding member of the International Badminton Federation, since renamed to Badminton World Federation (BWF), which is the international governing body for the sport.

National badminton centre
The National Badminton Centre in Loughton, Milton Keynes is a purpose-built elite training facility that provides a base for the Great Britain and England badminton squads and has a number of badminton courts, meeting rooms and accommodation facilities. The facility is partly funded by commercial conference letting.

Location

The Centre is near the junction of the A5 with the A509, just west of Central Milton Keynes.  However, because this junction is grade separated, vehicular access is from Dansteed Way (H4). Pedestrian/cycle access from Milton Keynes Central railway station is via a redway from Elder Gate beside the Quadrant:MK (Network Rail national centre)

See also 
All England Open Badminton Championships
Badminton
International Badminton Federation
European Badminton Union
English National Badminton Championships

References

External links 
BADMINTON England
badminton.tv - BADMINTON England media services

England
Badminton in England
Sports governing bodies in England
1893 establishments in England
Sport in Milton Keynes
1893 in English sport
Organisations based in Milton Keynes